In mathematics, Kadison transitivity theorem is a result in the theory of C*-algebras that, in effect, asserts the equivalence of the notions of topological irreducibility and algebraic irreducibility of representations of C*-algebras. It implies that, for irreducible representations of C*-algebras, the only non-zero linear invariant subspace is the whole space.

The theorem, proved by Richard Kadison, was surprising as a priori there is no reason to believe that all topologically irreducible representations are also algebraically irreducible.

Statement

Theorem. If  for some self-adjoint operator , then  can be chosen to be self-adjoint.

Corollary. If the C*-algebra  acts topologically irreducibly on the Hilbert space , then it acts algebraically irreducibly.

References

 .
 Kadison, R. V.; Ringrose, J. R., Fundamentals of the Theory of Operator Algebras, Vol. I : Elementary Theory, 

Operator algebras